Colombia competed at the 1996 Summer Olympics in Atlanta, United States. 48 competitors, 39 men and 9 women, took part in 44 events in 9 sports.

Athletics

Men's 5,000 metres 
 William Roldán
 Qualification — 14:39.50 (→ did not advance)

Men's 10,000 metres
Herder Vázquez

Men's Marathon
 Carlos Grisales — 2:15.56 (→ 11th place)
 Julio Hernández — 2:41.56 (→ 102nd place)

Men's 20 km Walk
Héctor Moreno

Men's 50 km Walk
Héctor Moreno — 3:54:57 (→ 16th place)

Men's High Jump
Gilmar Mayo

Women's 100 metres
Zandra Borrero
Mirtha Brock

Women's 200 metres
Patricia Rodríguez
Felipa Palacios

Women's 400 metres
 Ximena Restrepo
 Heat — did not finish (→ did not advance)

Women's Marathon
 Iglandini González — 2:35.45 (→ 22nd place)

Women's 4×100 metres Relay
Mirtha Brock, Felipa Palacios, Patricia Rodríguez, and Zandra Borrero

Women's Javelin Throw
 Zuleima Aramendiz
 Qualification — 54.24m (→ did not advance)

Boxing

Men's Light Flyweight (– 48 kg)
Beibis Mendoza
 First Round — Defeated Domenic Figliomeni (Canada), 12-1
 Second Round — Lost to Oleg Kiryukhin (Ukraine), 6-18

Men's Flyweight (– 51 kg)
Daniel Reyes
 First Round — Defeated Tebebu Behonen (Ethiopia), 16-2
 Second Round — Defeated Khaled Falah (Syria), 15-13
 Quarter Finals — Lost to Albert Pakeyev (Russia), 13-13 (referee decision)

Men's Bantamweight (– 54 kg)
Marcos Verbal
 First Round — Lost to Hicham Nafil (Morocco), 3-16

Men's Light Welterweight (– 63,5 kg)
Dairo Esalas
 First Round — Lost to Jervy Le Gras (Seychelles), 12-26

Cycling

Road Competition
Men's Individual Road Race
Ruber Marín
Javier Zapata
Óscar Giraldo
Dubán Ramírez
Raúl Montaña

Men's Individual Time Trial
Dubán Ramírez
 Final — 1:11:18 (→ 29th place)
Javier Zapata
 Final — 1:15:09 (→ 37th and last place)

Women's Individual Road Race
Maritza Corredor
 Final — did not finish (→ no ranking)

Women's Individual Time Trial
Maritza Corredor
 Final — 42:06 (→ 24th and last place)

Track Competition
Men's Team Pursuit (4,000 metres)
 Jhon García
 Marlon Pérez
 Yovani López
 José Velásquez

Men's Points Race
 Marlon Pérez
 Final — did not finish (→ no ranking)

Mountain Bike
Men's Cross Country
 Jhon Arias
 Final — 2:42:04 (→ 23rd place)
 Juan Arias
 Final — 2:50:44 (→ 34th place)

Equestrianism

Mixed Jumping Individual
Manuel Guillermo Torres
Alejandro Davila

Fencing

Two fencers, both men, represented Colombia in 1996.

Men's épée
 Mauricio Rivas
 Juan Miguel Paz

Shooting

Men's Air Pistol, 10 metres
 Bernardo Tovar

Men's Rapid-Fire Pistol, 25 metres
 Bernardo Tovar

Men's Free Pistol, 50 metres
 Bernardo Tovar

Men's Trap
 Danilo Caro

Swimming

Men's 400m Freestyle
 Alejandro Bermúdez
 Heat — 3:57.45 (→ did not advance, 21st place)

Men's 100m Breaststroke
 Mauricio Moreno
 Heat — 1:05.22 (→ did not advance, 32nd place)

Men's 100m Butterfly
 Diego Perdomo
 Heat — 55.08 (→ did not advance, 30th place)

Men's 400m Individual Medley
 Alejandro Bermúdez
 Heat — 4:27.97
 B-Final — 4:26.64 (→ 13th place)

Women's 200m Breaststroke
 Isabel Ceballos
 Heat — 2:36.94 (→ did not advance, 28th place)

Weightlifting

Men's Flyweight
Juan Fernández
Nelson Castro

Men's Featherweight
Roger Berrio

Men's Middleweight
Álvaro Velasco

Men's Heavyweight
Deivan Valencia

Wrestling

Men's Greco-Roman Lightweight 
José Uber Escobar

Men's Greco-Roman Heavyweight 
Juan Diego Giraldo

Men's Freestyle Light-Flyweight 
José Manuel Restrepo

See also
Sports in Colombia
Colombia at the 1995 Pan American Games

References

External links
Official Olympic Reports

Nations at the 1996 Summer Olympics
1996 Summer Olympics
Olympics